The Unified Military Command of Eastern Ghouta was an operations room of Syrian rebel factions that operated in Eastern Ghouta, Syria.

After the death of Zahran Alloush in late 2015, there were conflicts between Jaysh al-Islam and other members of the command, along with associated groups such as Al-Nusra Front and their operations room Jaish Al-Fustat. Ahrar ash-Sham has remained neutral.

On 24 May 2016, leaders of Jaysh al-Islam & al-Rahman Legion  met to sign a peace deal to end hostilities.

Since the death of Zahran Alloush and the appointment of Essam al-Buwaydhani the operations room has become largely defunct.

See also
 List of armed groups in the Syrian Civil War

References

Anti-government factions of the Syrian civil war
Operations rooms of the Syrian civil war